The NBT Newsletter is a monthly newsletter published by the National Book Trust (NBT) of India.

It  contains information on activities conducted by the trust as well as new books released by them. NBT is an Indian publishing house, founded in 1957 as an autonomous body under the Ministry of Education within the Government of India. NBT now functions under aegis of Ministry of Human Resource Development, Govt. of India

Publishing companies of India